Hyainailouros ("hyena-cat") is an extinct polyphyletic genus of hyainailourid hyaenodont mammal of the polyphyletic tribe Hyainailourini within paraphyletic subfamily Hyainailourinae, that lived during the early to middle Miocene, of which there were at least three species spread across Europe, Africa, and Asia.

Closely related to other large African hyaenodonts such as Simbakubwa and Megistotherium, Hyainailouros walked with a semi-digitigrade stance and was probably capable of large, leaping bounds.

Alongside its African relatives and the last members of the genus Hyaenodon from Asia, Hyainailouros was among the largest hyaenodonts that existed.

Phylogeny
The phylogenetic relationships of genus Hyainailouros are shown in the following cladogram:

See also
 Mammal classification
 Hyainailourini

References

Hyaenodonts
Miocene mammals of Europe
Miocene mammals of Africa
Miocene mammals of Asia
Prehistoric placental genera